Houshang Zarif (also Romanized as "Hūshang Zarīf"; December 7, 1938 – March 7, 2020) was a master of tar and Persian classical music.

Biography and career
Houshang Zarif was born in 1938 in Tehran. He was a graduate of the Persian National Music Conservatory in Tehran; where he studied tar with Mousa Maroufi. Zarif worked with the Fine Arts Administration Orchestra, conducted by Hossein Dehlavi in the 1950s and was the professor of tar at the National Conservatory for several years; Hossein Alizadeh was among his pupils.

Zarif died in Tehran on 7 March 2020.

Notable students
 Hossein Alizadeh
 Dariush Talai
 Hamid Motebassem

Notes

External links
 Persian Music by Houshang Zarif

1938 births
2020 deaths
Iranian tar players
Persian classical musicians
Musicians from Tehran